Miriam Vogt (born 20 March 1967 in Starnberg, then West Germany) is a former alpine skier who won the gold medal in the women's combined event at the 1993 World Championships in Morioka, Japan.

She retired from competition in 1998 and became President of the Bavarian Ski Federation (BSV) in 2005.

External links

Miriam Vogt statistics from skinet.jp

Alpine skiers at the 1994 Winter Olympics
Alpine skiers at the 1992 Winter Olympics
Olympic alpine skiers of Germany
German female alpine skiers
1967 births
Living people
People from Starnberg
Sportspeople from Upper Bavaria
20th-century German women